31stAnnie Awards
February 7, 2004

Best Feature Film: 
Finding Nemo

Best Television Program: 
The Simpsons

Best Home Video Production: 
The Animatrix

Best Short Subject: 
Boundin'

The 31st Annual Annie Awards honoring excellence in the field of animation of 2003 were held on February 7, 2004, at the Alex Theatre in Glendale, California.

Production nominees

Individual achievement categories

Juried awards

References

2003
2003 film awards
Annie
Annie